Guy Terrance Rucker (born July 27, 1977) is an American former professional basketball player. A power forward, he played college basketball at Iowa. Rucker played professional basketball from 1999 to 2005, mostly in the United States Basketball League, Continental Basketball Association, Europe, and Asia. For part of the 2002–03 season, Rucker played for the Golden State Warriors of the National Basketball Association (NBA).

Early life and college career
Born in Inkster, Michigan, Rucker graduated from John Glenn High School in nearby Westland in 1995. At the University of Iowa, Rucker redshirted his true freshman year and played for the Iowa Hawkeyes from 1996 to 1999.

Pro basketball career
He left the Hawkeyes at the end of his junior season to play professionally for the New Hampshire Thunder Loons of the United States Basketball League. Rucker played in Hungary for Debreceni Vadkakasok during the 2001–2002 season, where he averaged 14.7 points and 5.9 rebounds per game.

Rucker signed with the Los Angeles Lakers of the NBA on September 18, 2002, for preseason and was waived on October 28, 2002. On October 31, 2002, Rucker signed with the Golden State Warriors. He appeared in three games for the Warriors where he tallied four minutes, one rebound, one assist and no points. Rucker was waived by the Warriors on November 17, 2002. He later played in seven games for the Gary Steelheads of the Continental Basketball Association, averaging 4.4 points and 3.7 rebounds.

In 2004, Rucker played briefly for the Croatian team Jolly JBŠ of the ABA League and Rockford Lightning of the Continental Basketball Association. With the Lightning, Rucker averaged 13.8 points and 9.2 rebounds in five games. Rucker ended his basketball career in 2005 with the Anyang SBS Stars of the Korean Basketball League.

References

External links

Iowa Hawkeyes profile
College statistics

1977 births
Living people
American expatriate basketball people in Hungary
American men's basketball players
Basketball players from Michigan
Golden State Warriors players
Iowa Hawkeyes men's basketball players
People from Inkster, Michigan
Power forwards (basketball)
Undrafted National Basketball Association players
United States Basketball League players
American expatriate basketball people in Croatia
American expatriate basketball people in South Korea